Félix Dyotte is a Canadian singer-songwriter from Quebec, who won the SOCAN Songwriting Prize in 2020 as the writer of Evelyne Brochu's single "Maintenant ou jamais". He was nominated for the same award two prior times, for his songs "Avalanches" in 2016 and "Je cours" in 2018.

History
Dyotte was a guitarist with the Undercovers, a band which also included future members of the Stills, before joining with pianist Pierre-Alain Faucon and singer/guitarist Julien Fargo to create the band Chinatown in 2006, adding drummer Gabriel Rousseau and bassist Toby Cayouette. Faucon was best known for the song "Retour à Vega", which had been composed for his previous band in 2002, and then covered by the Stills for the soundtrack of the 2004 film Wicker Park. Chinatown also recorded their own version of "Retour à Vega" on their second album.

Chinatown released their debut EP, L'amour, le rêve et le whisky, in 2007 on the Tacca Musique label, followed by two studio albums, Cité d'or (2009) and Comment j'ai explosé (2012).

Following Chinatown's breakup, Dyotte released his self-titled solo album in 2015, followed by Politesses in 2017. He has also recorded a number of non-album singles as duets with other vocalists, including "Amour, amour" with Monia Chokri, "Effeuille-moi le cœur" with Kandle and "C'est l'été, c'est l'été, c'est l'été" with Evelyne Brochu.

Band members
Felix Dyotte: vocals, guitar 
Jason Kent: bass, vocals
Francis Mineau: drums

Discography

Chinatown
L'amour, le rêve et le whisky (2007)
Cité d'or (2009)
Comment j'ai explosé (2012)

Solo
Félix Dyotte (2015)
Politesses (2017)

References

External links

Canadian rock singers
Canadian male singers
Singers from Montreal
Writers from Montreal
Canadian indie rock musicians
French Quebecers
Living people
French-language singers of Canada
Canadian songwriters
Songwriters from Quebec
Year of birth missing (living people)